The decade of the 1310s in art involved some significant events.

Events
1311: June 9 – Duccio's Maestà altarpiece, a seminal artwork of the early Italian Renaissance, is unveiled in Siena Cathedral in Italy.

Works

 1313: Giovanni Pisano – monument in memory of Margaret of Brabant
 1314: Zhang Wo – Celebration in Jade Pool
 1319: Ambrogio Lorenzetti – Madonna and Child

Births
 1310: Giovanni di Agostino – Italian painter (died 1370)
 1315: Allegretto Nuzi – Italian painter (died 1373)

Deaths
 1319: Guan Daosheng – Chinese woman painter during the Yuan Dynasty (born 1262)
 1319: Duccio – – influential Italian artists of his time (born 1255)
 1317: Yishan Yining – Chinese Buddhist monk calligrapher, writer, and teacher (born 1247)
 1315: Giovanni Pisano – Italian sculptor, painter and architect (born 1255)
 1313: Guglielmo Agnelli – Italian sculptor and architect, born in Pisa (born 1238)
 1312: Gaddo Gaddi – Italian painter and mosaicist of Florence in a gothic art style (born 1239)
 1310: Gao Kegong – Chinese painter born during the Yuan dynasty (born 1248)
 1300/1310: Arnolfo di Cambio – Italian architect and sculptor (born 1240)

 
Years of the 14th century in art
Art